Homer Armstrong Thompson (September 7, 1906 – May 7, 2000) was a Canadian classical archaeologist of the twentieth century, specializing in ancient Greece. While studying for his doctorate at the University of Michigan, Benjamin Dean Meritt (later a faculty member at the Institute for Advanced Study) would introduce Thompson to the project which would occupy him for the rest of his life. The American School of Classical Studies at Athens was about to begin the excavation of the agora in Athens and Thompson was selected as a fellow of the school to aid in the project.  Excavations began on May 25, 1931; Thompson would work on the excavations for the next 39 years.  He was married to a fellow archaeologist Dorothy Burr Thompson.

Early life and education
Thompson was born in Devlin, Ontario, Canada, as the second child of William and Gertrude Thompson. The younger years of his life were split between Lauderdale Farm in Rosedale and Chilliwack, British Columbia.  Since Chilliwack Senior Secondary School was not easily accessible from the farm, he and his sister, Jean, boarded with Grace Baldwin and her family on Williams Street in Chilliwack. At school, he was influenced by Principal Harry Fraser, who taught and encouraged young Homer in his pursuit of Latin. Homer's father, who had also studied the classics before becoming a farmer, encouraged his son as well.

At the young age of 15, Thompson graduated from Chiliwack High School. He enrolled to study the classics at the University of British Columbia, as well as becoming a member of the track team, the business manager for Student Publications, and the president of the Classics Club. Thompson focused on Latin and earned his B.A. with honours in only three years. He stayed to continue his studies and in 1927 received his M.A. with first-class honours. At this time he was only 19 years old and became the youngest classics professor in Canada. Thompson chose archaeology for his doctoral studies, and in a highly unusual two years, was awarded his Ph.D. from the University of Michigan.

Life and career

Soon after completing his doctorate, Thompson was awarded a three-year fellowship of $4,500 by the American School of Classical Studies in Greece to assist on excavations.  He was to work primarily at Corinth but also in the agora in Athens.  After spending some time in working in Athens, he became passionate about the Athenian agora and the possible work to be done there; it would become the focus of his career.

While excavating in Athens in 1932, Homer met Dorothy Burr. At the time she was the only female fellow working on the excavations in Athens.   Dorothy's concentration of study revolved around excavating and publishing her finds on the Athenian gardens and terracotta figurines. As Homer recalls it, Dorothy was "one of [his] more remarkable finds."  She also was a classics enthusiast and worked with him at the Institute for Advanced Study as well as in Athens. In 1934, the well-matched couple was married.

A year later, Dorothy gave birth to twins, Hilary and Hope, and three years after that they were blessed with another daughter Pamela. However, she pursued her career as well, unlike many women of the era. Excepting the war years, from 1933 to 1947 Homer and Dorothy spent the summers of every year in Athens and the remaining months teaching at the University of Toronto.

In 1947, the Thompsons moved on to Princeton's Institute for Advanced Study.

Thompson received numerous awards during his long career.  These included: Fellow of the American Academy of Arts and Sciences (1957), the Gold Medal for Distinguished Archaeological Achievement from the Archaeological Institute of America (1972), the Lucy Wharton Drexel Gold Medal of the University Museum at the University of Pennsylvania (1978), the Kenyon Medal for Classical Studies from the British Academy (1991), and the Thomas Jefferson Medal for Distinguished Achievement in the Humanities from the American Philosophical Society (1996), of which he was also a member.

Thompson died in Hightstown, New Jersey.

Sources
 Diffendale D.P. (2014) Thompson, Homer. In: Smith C. (eds) Encyclopedia of Global Archaeology. Springer, New York, NY. https://doi.org/10.1007/978-1-4419-0465-2_933
 Dyson, Stephen L. and Daniel Graepler, "Thompson, Homer Armstrong" In Brill’s New Pauly Supplements I - Volume 6 : History of classical Scholarship - A Biographical Dictionary, 2013-12-04

Necrology
 Rotroff, Susan I. "Homer Armstrong Thompson, 1906-2000." American Journal of Archaeology 105, no. 1 (2001): 99-100. Accessed April 5, 2021. http://www.jstor.org/stable/507328.
 McCredie, James R. "Homer Armstrong Thompson: 7 September 1906 · 7 May 2000." Proceedings of the American Philosophical Society 146, no. 4 (2002): 412–14. Accessed April 5, 2021. http://www.jstor.org/stable/1558316.
 Martin, Douglas "Homer Thompson Dies at 93; Led Excavation of the Agora" New York Times May 13, 2000 https://www.nytimes.com/2000/05/13/nyregion/homer-thompson-dies-at-93-led-excavation-of-the-agora.html

References

1906 births
2000 deaths
Canadian archaeologists
Institute for Advanced Study faculty
People from Rainy River District
Canadian expatriate academics in the United States
Fellows of the American Academy of Arts and Sciences
University of Michigan alumni
People from Chilliwack
Corresponding Fellows of the British Academy
Canadian expatriates in the United States
Members of the American Philosophical Society